Wikibooks (previously called Wikimedia Free Textbook Project and Wikimedia-Textbooks) is a wiki-based Wikimedia project hosted by the Wikimedia Foundation for the creation of free content digital textbooks and annotated texts that anyone can edit.

Initially, the project was created solely in English in July 2003; a later expansion to include additional languages was started in July 2004.

History 
It was launched to host and build free textbooks on subjects such as organic chemistry and physics, in response to a request by Wikipedia contributor Karl Wick. Two major sub-projects, Wikijunior and Wikiversity, were created within Wikibooks before its official policy was later changed so that future incubator-type projects are started according to the Wikimedia Foundation's new project policy.

In August 2006, Wikiversity became an independent Wikimedia Foundation project.

Since 2008, Wikibooks has been included in BASE.

In June 2016, Compete.com estimated that Wikibooks had 1,478,812 unique visitors.

Wikijunior 
Wikijunior is a subproject of Wikibooks that specializes in books for children. The project consists of both a magazine and a website, and is currently being developed in English, Danish, Finnish, French, German, Italian, Japanese, Spanish, Arabic and Bangla. It is funded by a grant from the Beck Foundation.

Book content 

While some books are original, others began as text copied over from other sources of free content textbooks found on the Internet. All of the site's content is released under a Creative Commons Attribution-Share Alike license (or a compatible license). This means that, as with its sister project, Wikipedia, contributions remain copyrighted to their creators, while the licensing ensures that it can be freely distributed and reused subject to certain conditions.

Wikibooks differs from Wikisource in that Wikisource collects exact copies and original translations of existing free content works, such as the original text of Shakespearean plays, while Wikibooks is dedicated either to original works, significantly altered versions of existing works, or annotations to original works.

Multilingual statistics 
The active sites have  articles and the closed sites have  articles.

The top ten Wikibooks language projects by mainspace article count:

For a complete list with totals, see Wikimedia Statistics.

See also 
 WikiToLearn
 CK-12 Foundation
 Digital library
 European Library
 Free High School Science Texts
 Global Text
 ibiblio
 LibriVox, an online digital library of free public domain audiobooks.
 Open Content Alliance
 Open textbook
 Project Gutenberg
 Universal library
 Wikibooks:What is Wikibooks?

References

Further reading

External links 

 
 Wikibooks Language Editions: list of Wikibooks for various languages ordered by size.
 Wikibooks page on Meta-Wiki
 Wikibooks takes on textbook industry

Advertising-free websites
Ebook sources
Ebook suppliers
Internet properties established in 2003
Multilingual websites
Wikimedia projects